Viktor Lodin (born 2 June 1999) is a Swedish professional ice hockey center who is currently playing for the Belleville Senators in the American Hockey League (AHL) as a prospect to the Ottawa Senators of the National Hockey League (NHL).

Playing career
Lodin was drafted in the fourth round, 94th overall, by the Ottawa Senators in the 2019 NHL Entry Draft. Lodin made his SHL debut playing for Örebro HK in 2018, playing in 41 games in the 2018–19 SHL season.

Out of contract from Örebro HK leading into the 2020–21 season, Lodin was signed to a one-year contract with Timrå IK of the HockeyAllsvenskan on 27 July 2020.

On 1 June 2021, Lodin was signed to a two-year, entry-level contract with the Ottawa Senators beginning in the 2021–22 season. On 9 July 2021, Lodin was loaned by the Senators to continue his development with Timrå IK in their return to the SHL for the duration of the season. After helping Timrå IK avoid relegation to a lower tier of Swedish hockey, Lodin joined the Ottawa Senators American Hockey League (AHL) affiliate, the Belleville Senators, towards the end of their season. In the first nine games after arriving in Belleville, he scored five goals and seven points, helping Belleville make the AHL playoffs. He was recalled from Belleville on 29 April 2022 and played in his first NHL game in the Senators 4–2 victory over the Philadelphia Flyers that night.

Career statistics

References

External links
 

1999 births
Living people
Belleville Senators players
Ottawa Senators draft picks
Ottawa Senators players
People from Leksand Municipality
Swedish ice hockey centres
Timrå IK players
HC Vita Hästen players
Örebro HK players
Sportspeople from Dalarna County